Amaralia hypsiura (Carachita), is a species of catfish of the family Aspredinidae. A. hypsiura are found throughout the Amazon River basin. They are medium-sized aspredinids (not exceeding 133 millimetres or 5.2 in SL). These fish have a deep, laterally compressed caudal peduncle, a reduced dorsal fin with only 2–3 rays, and well-developed head ornamentation.

References

Aspredinidae
Fish of the Amazon basin
Taxa named by Rudolf Kner
Fish described in 1855